Rinaldo Moresco (born 25 January 1925) was an Italian professional road cyclist. Professional from 1950 to 1956, he had several successes during his career, including winning the Giro dell'Appennino in 1951 and the Giro di Toscana the following year.

Major results
1950
 1st Stages 1 & 3 Giro di Sicilia
1951
 1st Giro dell'Appennino
 2nd Giro del Lazio
 2nd Trofeo Matteotti
1952
 1st Giro di Toscana
 3rd Road race, National Road Championships
 3rd Giro dell'Appennino
 10th Milan–San Remo
1953
 5th Giro della Provincia di Reggio Calabria
 8th Giro dell'Emilia
 10th Giro del Veneto
1954
 4th Tre Valli Varesine

References

1925 births
Possibly living people
Italian male cyclists
Sportspeople from the Province of Genoa
Cyclists from Liguria